The Sydney Eisteddfod is an independent community based not-for-profit organisation limited by guarantee a registered charity  in Sydney, Australia, and listed on the federal Register of Cultural Organisations eligible to receive tax-deductible donations.  Directors and advisors are honorary.

About 
Sydney Eisteddfod annually presents a competitive festival with the help of arts and education professionals.  The Festival involves events for singers, dancers, actors, musicians, choirs, bands and orchestras, along with creative categories for composers, writers and poets.

The Sydney Eisteddfod formerly known as the City of Sydney Eisteddfod opened in 1933. held from 9 to 26 August 1933 in the Sydney Town Hall, The Assembly Halls, The Railway Institute Halls and Paling's concert Hall. The illustrated souvenir programme cost one shilling.

The Sydney Eisteddfod  acts as a reference source for public enquiries about other competitions and opportunities, arts organisations and supports groups, performances presented by commercial and non-profit presenters; encourages opportunities for public performance by developing artists; promoting recitals, concerts and performances; nurtures interest in the performing and creative arts, and cultivates future audiences.

Sydney Eisteddfod won the City of Sydney Business Award, Cultural and Creative Services section in 2011

Current organization information 
Co Patrons
  General David Hurley, Governor of New South Wales and Mrs Linda Hurley

Life Member
 Dame Marie Bashir

Vice-Patrons
 Sir Nicholas Shehadie
 Doug Sutherland

Artistic patrons
Richard Bonynge
Maina Gielgud

Ambassadors
 Angela Bishop
 Amelia Farrugia
 Joshua Horner
 Geoffrey T. Jones
 Simon Kenway
 Nicholas Milton
 Steven McRae
 Stuart Skelton
 Simon Tedeschi
 Simone Young
 Leone Ziegler

History
The Sydney Eisteddfod grew out of Music Week Festival, first held in 1930 and which grew into a national event by 1932. Representatives of Music Week Festival and CA 244, the Citizen's of Sydney Organising Committee, announced plans for a Great Eisteddfod at the end of 1932, to be held at the Town Hall in August 1933 during the fourth Annual Music Week festival. (Source: Jennifer Rowley Lees, 2008, The Sydney Eisteddfod Story: 1933 – 1941)

The NSW State Conservatorium and President of the NSW Music Week Committee drew up a proposal to hold a large-scale event to bring together the best musical and elocutionary talent of the various States.  On 22 December, this was adopted at a meeting at the Sydney Town Hall under the chairmanship of the Lord Mayor Samuel Walder MLC.

The first Eisteddfod executive meeting was held on 20 February 1933 and the first Official Syllabus was released in April that year.

In the 1933 New Year Honours, Walder received a knighthood. He relinquished his mayoral duties, but continued his career in State politics, retained his place on the Citizens of Sydney Organising Committee and continued to support the Eisteddfod.

The First City of Sydney Eisteddfod offered a programme of 84 vocal, choral, speech and musical events and drew 5,410 entries.  It opened to great success on 19 August 1933 with artist including Joan Hammond, Ernest Llewellyn and Joy Nichols.

Apart from a four-year recess during the Pacific War the competition has continued ever since.  The Citizens Committee disbanded in 1950, but the Eisteddfod continued with the same mix of political, civic, educational and industry leadership.  The City of Sydney Cultural Council was incorporated in 1975 to embrace a wider range of activities.

McDonald's Australia commenced its association with Sydney Eisteddfod (formerly known as Sydney cultural Council) in 1988 with naming rights sponsorship.
McDonald's Australia have also supported the McDonald's Operatic Aria since 1989 and the McDonald's Ballet Scholarship since 1998 providing the necessary nutrient for encouraging and developing artistic talent across Australia.

The Eisteddfod was cancelled in 2020 due to "health and safety concerns" over the COVID-19 pandemic in Australia. In 83 years it has only been cancelled once before, during World War 2.

Beginning their careers with Sydney Eisteddfod

Dame Joan Sutherland

Further reading

References

External links
 Sydney Eisteddfod website
 Sydney Eisteddfod Facebook

Non-profit organisations based in New South Wales
Eisteddfod
Festivals in Sydney
Welsh Australian